Pir Aghaj may refer to:
 Pir Aghaj, Ardabil
 Pir Aghaj, Golestan